Årsetfjorden is a smaller fjord off of the main Lekafjorden in Trøndelag and Nordland counties in Norway. The fjord lies mostly in Nærøysund municipality (in Trøndelag), but the far northern end of the fjord lies in Bindal municipality (in Nordland). The fjord gets its name from the small village of Årset on its northwestern side. The island of Austra lies on the west side of the fjord.

See also
 List of Norwegian fjords

References

Nærøysund
Nærøy
Fjords of Trøndelag